Lasmid Nathaniel Owusu popularly known with the stage name Lasmid (fka Charger) is a Ghanaian musician and songwriter from Takoradi. He was crowned winner of the MTN Hitmaker Season 8. He is best known for the viral song Friday Night which gained attention in Ghana topping charts after it became a trend on TikTok.

Career 
In 2019, Lasmid won the MTN Hitmaker season 8 competition, for which he received a GH₵120,000 recording contract. Following the contest, Ghanaian music producer Kaywa signed him to his record label, Highly Spiritual Music. In 2022, Nigerian singer Naira Marley expressed interest in signing Lasmid to his label.

As of 2022, he had worked on songs with Sarkodie, Medikal, Kofi Kinaata, Dead Peepol, Mr Drew, Kuami Eugene and Amerado

Discography 

 Odo Lastic ft Kofi Kinaata
 Atele
 Sika ft Dead Peepol
 Father ft Mr Drew
 Sika Remix ft Kuami Eugene
 Friday Night
 Amerado – Grace (as a featured artiste)

References 

Ghanaian male singer-songwriters
Ghanaian musicians
Year of birth missing (living people)
Living people